The Underground Railroad was a network of clandestine routes and safe houses established in the United States during the early- to the mid-19th century. It was used by enslaved African Americans primarily to escape into free states and Canada. The network was assisted by abolitionists and others sympathetic to the cause of the escapees. The enslaved persons who risked escape and those who aided them are also collectively referred to as the "Underground Railroad". Various other routes led to Mexico, where slavery had been abolished, and to islands in the Caribbean that were not part of the slave trade. An earlier escape route running south toward Florida, then a Spanish possession (except 1763–1783), existed from the late 17th century until approximately 1790. However, the network now generally known as the Underground Railroad began in the late 18th century. It ran north and grew steadily until the Emancipation Proclamation was signed by President Abraham Lincoln. One estimate suggests that by 1850, approximately 100,000 enslaved people had escaped to freedom via the network.

Origin of the name
Eric Foner writes that the first usage may have been a Washington newspaper in 1839, which stated that the railroad "went underground all the way to Boston."

Political background

For the enslaved people who "rode" the Underground Railroad, many of them considered Canada their final destination. An estimated 30,000 to 40,000 freedom seekers settled in Canada, half of whom came between 1850 and 1860. Others settled in free states in the north. Thousands of court cases for escaped enslaved were recorded between the Revolutionary War and the Civil War. Under the original Fugitive Slave Act of 1793, officials from free states were required to assist slaveholders or their agents who recaptured fugitives, but some state legislatures prohibited this. The law made it easier for slaveholders and slave catchers to capture African Americans and return them to slavery, and in some cases allowed them to enslave free blacks. It also created an eagerness among abolitionists to help enslaved people, resulting in the growth of anti-slavery societies and the Underground Railroad.

With heavy lobbying by Southern politicians, the Compromise of 1850 was passed by Congress after the Mexican–American War. It stipulated a more stringent Fugitive Slave Law; ostensibly, the compromise addressed regional problems by compelling officials of free states to assist slave catchers, granting them immunity to operate in free states. Because the law required sparse documentation to claim a person was a fugitive, slave catchers also kidnapped free blacks, especially children, and sold them into slavery. Southern politicians often exaggerated the number of escaped slaves and often blamed these escapes on Northerners interfering with Southern property rights. The law deprived people suspected of being slaves of the right to defend themselves in court, making it difficult to prove free status. Some Northern states enacted personal liberty laws that made it illegal for public officials to capture or imprison former slaves.  The perception that Northern states ignored the fugitive slave laws and regulations was a major justification offered for secession.

Routes

Underground Railroad routes went north to free states and Canada, to the Caribbean, into United States western territories, and Indian territories. Some freedom seekers (escaped slaves) travelled South into Mexico for their freedom.

North to free states and Canada

Structure

Despite the thoroughfare's name, the escape network was neither literally underground nor a railroad. (The first literal underground railroad did not exist until 1863.) According to John Rankin, "It was so called because they who took passage on it disappeared from public view as really as if they had gone into the ground. After the fugitive slaves entered a depot on that road no trace of them could be found. They were secretly passed from one depot to another until they arrived at a destination where they were able to remain free." It was known as a railroad, using rail terminology such as stations and conductors, because that was the transportation system in use at the time.

The Underground Railroad did not have a headquarters or governing body, nor were there published guides, maps, pamphlets, or even newspaper articles. The Underground Railroad consisted of meeting points, secret routes, transportation, and safe houses, all of them maintained by abolitionist sympathizers and communicated by word of mouth, although there is also a report of a numeric code used to encrypt messages. Participants generally organized in small, independent groups; this helped to maintain secrecy. People escaping enslavement would move north along the route from one way station to the next. "Conductors" on the railroad came from various backgrounds and included free-born blacks, white abolitionists, the formerly enslaved (either escaped or manumitted), and Native Americans. Believing that slavery was "contrary to the ethics of Jesus", Christian congregations and clergy played a role, especially the Religious Society of Friends (Quakers), Congregationalists, Wesleyan Methodists, and Reformed Presbyterians, as well as the anti-slavery branches of mainstream denominations which entered into schism over the issue, such as the Methodist Episcopal Church and the Baptists. The role of free blacks was crucial; without it, there would have been almost no chance for fugitives from slavery to reach freedom safely. The groups of underground railroad "agents" worked in organizations known as vigilance committees.

Routes

The Underground Railroad benefited greatly from the geography of the U.S.–Canada border: Michigan, Ohio, Pennsylvania and most of New York were separated from Canada by water, over which transport was usually easy to arrange and relatively safe. The main route for freedom seekers from the South led up the Appalachians, Harriet Tubman going via Harpers Ferry, through the highly anti-slavery Western Reserve region of northeastern Ohio to the vast shore of Lake Erie, and then to Canada by boat. A smaller number, travelling by way of New York or New England, went via Syracuse (home of Samuel May) and Rochester, New York (home of Frederick Douglass), crossing the Niagara River or Lake Ontario into Canada. Those traveling via the New York Adirondacks, sometimes via the Black communities like Timbuctoo, New York, entered Canada via Ogdensburg, on the St. Lawrence River, or Lake Champlain (Joshua Young assisted). The western route, used by John Brown among others, led from Missouri west to free Kansas and north to free Iowa, then east via Chicago to the Detroit River.

Terminology

Members of the Underground Railroad often used specific terms, based on the metaphor of the railway. For example:

 People who helped enslaved people find the railroad were "agents" (or "shepherds")
 Guides were known as "conductors"
 Hiding places were "stations" or "way stations"
 "Station masters" hid escaping slaves in their homes
 People escaping slavery were referred to as "passengers" or "cargo"
 Enslaved people would obtain a "ticket"
 Similar to common gospel lore, the "wheels would keep on turning"
 Financial benefactors of the Railroad were known as "stockholders"

The Big Dipper (whose "bowl" points to the North Star) was known as the drinkin' gourd. The Railroad was often known as the "freedom train" or "Gospel train", which headed towards "Heaven" or "the Promised Land", i.e., Canada.

William Still, sometimes called "The Father of the Underground Railroad", helped hundreds of slaves escape (as many as 60 a month), sometimes hiding them in his Philadelphia home. He kept careful records, including short biographies of the people, that contained frequent railway metaphors. He maintained correspondence with many of them, often acting as a middleman in communications between people who had escaped slavery and those left behind. He later published these accounts in the book The Underground Railroad: Authentic Narratives and First-Hand Accounts (1872), a valuable resource for historians to understand how the system worked and learn about individual ingenuity in escapes.

According to Still, messages were often encoded so that they could be understood only by those active in the railroad. For example, the following message, "I have sent via at two o'clock four large hams and two small hams", indicated that four adults and two children were sent by train from Harrisburg to Philadelphia. The additional word via indicated that the "passengers" were not sent on the usual train, but rather via Reading, Pennsylvania. In this case, the authorities were tricked into going to the regular location (station) in an attempt to intercept the runaways, while Still met them at the correct station and guided them to safety. They eventually escaped either further north or to Canada, where slavery had been abolished during the 1830s.

To reduce the risk of infiltration, many people associated with the Underground Railroad knew only their part of the operation and not of the whole scheme. "Conductors" led or transported the "passengers" from station to station. A conductor sometimes pretended to be enslaved to enter a plantation. Once a part of a plantation, the conductor would direct the runaways to the North. They rested, and then a message was sent to the next station to let the station master know the escapees were on their way. They would stop at the so-called "stations" or "depots" during the day and rest. The stations were often located in basements, barns, churches, or in hiding places in caves.

The resting spots where the freedom seekers could sleep and eat were given the code names "stations" and "depots", which were held by "station masters". "Stockholders" gave money or supplies for assistance. Using biblical references, fugitives referred to Canada as the "Promised Land" or "Heaven" and the Ohio River, which marked the boundary between slave states and free states, as the "River Jordan".

The majority of freedom seekers that escaped from slavery did not have help from an abolitionist. Although there are stories of black and white abolitionists helping freedom seekers escape from slavery many escapes were unaided. 
Other Underground Railroad escape routes for freedom seekers were maroon communities. Maroon communities were wetlands or marshes where escaped slaves established their own independent communities. Maroon communities in the United States were in Virginia called the Great Dismal Swamp, the maroon communities of the Black Seminole Indians in Florida, and others.

Traveling conditions

Although the freedom seekers sometimes traveled on boat or train, they usually traveled on foot or by wagon, sometimes lying down, covered with hay or similar products, in groups of one to three escapees. Some groups were considerably larger. Abolitionist Charles Turner Torrey and his colleagues rented horses and wagons and often transported as many as 15 or 20 people at a time. Free and enslaved black men occupied as mariners (sailors) helped enslaved people escape from slavery by providing a ride on their ship, providing information on the safest and best escape routes, and safe locations on land, and locations of trusted people for assistance. Enslaved African-American mariners had information about slave revolts occurring in the Caribbean, and relayed this news to enslaved people they had contact with in American ports. Free and enslaved African-American mariners assisted Harriet Tubman in her rescue missions. Black mariners provided to her information about the best escape routes, and helped her on her rescue missions.

Routes were often purposely indirect to confuse pursuers. Most escapes were by individuals or small groups; occasionally, there were mass escapes, such as with the Pearl incident. The journey was often considered particularly difficult and dangerous for women or children. Children were sometimes hard to keep quiet or were unable to keep up with a group. In addition, enslaved women were rarely allowed to leave the plantation, making it harder for them to escape in the same ways that men could. Although escaping was harder for women, some women were successful. One of the most famous and successful conductors (people who secretly traveled into slave states to rescue those seeking freedom) was Harriet Tubman, a woman who escaped slavery.

Due to the risk of discovery, information about routes and safe havens was passed along by word of mouth, although in 1896 there is a reference to a numerical code used to encrypt messages. Southern newspapers of the day were often filled with pages of notices soliciting information about fugitive slaves and offering sizable rewards for their capture and return. Federal marshals and professional bounty hunters known as slave catchers pursued freedom seekers as far as the Canada–U.S. border.

"Reverse Underground Railroad"
Freedom seekers were not the only black people at risk from slave catchers. With demand for slaves high in the Deep South as cotton was planted, strong, healthy blacks in their prime working and reproductive years were seen and treated as highly valuable commodities. Both former slaves and free blacks were sometimes kidnapped and sold into slavery, as in the well-documented case of Solomon Northup, a New York-born free black who was kidnapped by Southern slavers while visiting Washington DC. "Certificates of Freedom," signed, notarized statements attesting to the free status of individual Blacks also known as free papers, could easily be destroyed or stolen, so they provided little protection.

Some buildings, such as the Crenshaw House in far-southeastern Illinois, are known sites where free blacks were sold into slavery, known as the "Reverse Underground Railroad".

Fugitive Slave Act of 1850
Under the terms of the Fugitive Slave Act of 1850, when suspected fugitives were seized and brought to a special magistrate known as a commissioner, they had no right to a jury trial and could not testify on their own behalf. Technically, they were not accused of a crime. The marshal or private slave-catcher needed only to swear an oath to acquire a writ of replevin for the return of property.

Congress was dominated by Southern congressmen because the population of their states was bolstered by the inclusion of three-fifths of the number of slaves in population totals. They passed the Fugitive Slave Law of 1850 because of frustration at having fugitives from slavery helped by the public and even official institutions outside the South. In some parts of the North, slave-catchers needed police protection.

Arrival in Canada

British North America (present-day Canada) was a desirable destination, as its long border gave many points of access, it was farther from slave catchers, and beyond the reach of the United States' Fugitive Slave Acts. Further, slavery ended decades earlier in Canada than in the United States.  Britain banned the institution of slavery in present-day Canada (and in most British colonies) in 1833, though the practice of slavery in Canada had effectively ended already early in the 19th century through case law, due to court decisions resulting from litigation on behalf of slaves seeking manumission.

Most former enslaved, reaching Canada by boat across Lake Erie and Lake Ontario, settled in Ontario. More than 30,000 people were said to have escaped there via the network during its 20-year peak period, although U.S. census figures account for only 6,000. Numerous fugitives' stories are documented in the 1872 book The Underground Railroad Records by William Still, an abolitionist who then headed the Philadelphia Vigilance Committee.

Estimates vary widely, but at least 30,000 slaves, and potentially more than 100,000, escaped to Canada via the Underground Railroad. The largest group settled in Upper Canada (Ontario), called Canada West from 1841. Numerous Black Canadian communities developed in Southern Ontario. These were generally in the triangular region bounded by Niagara Falls, Toronto, and Windsor. Several rural villages made up mostly of people freed from slavery were established in Kent and Essex counties in Ontario.

Fort Malden, in Amherstburg, Ontario, was deemed the "chief place of entry" for escaped slaves seeking to enter Canada. The abolitionist Levi Coffin, who was known for aiding over 2,000 fugitives to safety, supported this choice. He described Fort Malden as "the great landing place, the principle terminus of the underground railroad of the west." After 1850, approximately thirty people a day were crossing over to Fort Malden by steamboat. The Sultana was one of the ships, making "frequent round trips" between Great Lakes ports. Its captain, C.W. Appleby, a celebrated mariner, facilitated the conveyance of several fugitives from various Lake Erie ports to Fort Malden. Other fugitives at Fort Walden had been assisted by William Wells Brown, himself someone who had escaped slavery. He found employment on a Lake Erie steamer and transported numerous fugitives from Cleveland to Ontario by way of Buffalo or Detroit. "It is well known", he tells us, "that a great number of fugitives make their escape to Canada, by way of Cleaveland. ...The friends of the slave, knowing that I would transport them without charge, never failed to have a delegation when the boat arrived at Cleaveland. I have sometimes had four or five on board at one time."

Another important destination was Nova Scotia, which was first settled by Black Loyalists during the American Revolution and then by Black Refugees during the War of 1812 (see Black Nova Scotians). Important Black settlements also developed in other parts of British North America (now parts of Canada). These included Lower Canada (present-day Quebec) and Vancouver Island, where Governor James Douglas encouraged Black immigration because of his opposition to slavery. He also hoped a significant Black community would form a bulwark against those who wished to unite the island with the United States.

Upon arriving at their destinations, many freedom seekers were disappointed, as life in Canada was difficult. While not at risk from slave catchers due to being in a different country, discrimination was still widespread . Many of the new arrivals had to compete with mass European immigration for jobs, and overt racism was common. For example, in reaction to Black Loyalists being settled in eastern Canada by the Crown, the city of Saint John, New Brunswick, amended its charter in 1785 specifically to exclude Blacks from practicing a trade, selling goods, fishing in the harbor, or becoming freemen; these provisions stood until 1870.

With the outbreak of the Civil War in the U.S., many black refugees left Canada to enlist in the Union Army. While some later returned to Canada, many remained in the United States. Thousands of others returned to the American South after the war ended. The desire to reconnect with friends and family was strong, and most were hopeful about the changes emancipation and Reconstruction would bring.

Folklore

Since the 1980s, claims have arisen that quilt designs were used to signal and direct enslaved people to escape routes and assistance. According to advocates of the quilt theory, ten quilt patterns were used to direct enslaved people to take particular actions. The quilts were placed one at a time on a fence as a means of nonverbal communication to alert escaping slaves. The code had a dual meaning: first to signal enslaved people to prepare to escape, and second to give clues and indicate directions on the journey.

The quilt design theory is disputed. The first published work documenting an oral history source was in 1999, and the first publication of this theory is believed to be a 1980 children's book. Quilt historians and scholars of pre-Civil War (1820–1860) America have disputed this legend. There is no contemporary evidence of any sort of quilt code, and quilt historians such as Pat Cummings and Barbara Brackman have raised serious questions about the idea. In addition, Underground Railroad historian Giles Wright has published a pamphlet debunking the quilt code.

Similarly, some popular, nonacademic sources claim that spirituals and other songs, such as "Steal Away" or "Follow the Drinking Gourd", contained coded information and helped individuals navigate the railroad. They have offered little evidence to support their claims. Scholars tend to believe that while the slave songs may certainly have expressed hope for deliverance from the sorrows of this world, these songs did not present literal help for runaway slaves.

The Underground Railroad inspired cultural works. For example, "Song of the Free", written in 1860 about a man fleeing slavery in Tennessee by escaping to Canada, was composed to the tune of "Oh! Susanna". Every stanza ends with a reference to Canada as the land "where colored men are free". Slavery in Upper Canada (now Ontario) was outlawed in 1793; in 1819, John Robinson, the Attorney General of Upper Canada, declared that by residing in Canada, black residents were set free, and that Canadian courts would protect their freedom. Slavery in Canada as a whole had been in rapid decline after an 1803 court ruling, and was finally abolished outright in 1834.

Legal and political

When frictions between North and South culminated in the Civil War, many Black people, both enslaved and free, fought for the Union Army. Following Union victory in the Civil War, on December 6, 1865, the Thirteenth Amendment to the Constitution outlawed slavery except as punishment for a crime. Following its passage, in some cases the Underground Railroad operated in the opposite direction, as people who had escaped to Canada returned to the United States.

Criticism

Frederick Douglass was a writer, statesman, and had escaped slavery. He wrote critically of the attention drawn to the ostensibly secret Underground Railroad in his first autobiography, Narrative of the Life of Frederick Douglass, an American Slave (1845):

He went on to say that, although he honors the movement, he felt that the efforts at publicity serve more to enlighten the slave-owners than the slaves, making them more watchful and making it more difficult for future slaves to escape.

Notable people

 Ann Bamford
 John Brown
 Owen Brown (father)
 Owen Brown (son)
 Samuel Burris
 Obadiah Bush
 Levi Coffin
 Elizabeth Rous Comstock
 George Corson
 Moses Dickson
 Frederick Douglass
 Asa Drury
 George Hussey Earle Sr. 
 Calvin Fairbank
 Bartholomew Fussell 
 Matilda Joslyn Gage
 Thomas Galt
 Thomas Garrett
 Sydney Howard Gay
 Josiah Bushnell Grinnell
 Frances Harper
 Laura Smith Haviland
 Lewis Hayden
 John Hunn
 Roger Hooker Leavitt
 Jermain Wesley Loguen
 Samuel Joseph May
 John Berry Meachum
 Mary Meachum
 William M. Mitchell
 Solomon Northup
 John Parker
 Elijah F. Pennypacker 
 Mary Ellen Pleasant
 John Wesley Posey
 Amy and Isaac Post
 John Rankin
 Alexander Milton Ross
 David Ruggles
 Gerrit Smith
 George Luther Stearns
 William Still
 John Ton
 Charles Turner Torrey
 William Troy
 Harriet Tubman
 Martha Coffin Wright
 John Van Zandt
 Bernardhus Van Leer
 Silvia Hector Webber

South to Florida and Mexico

Background 

Beginning in the 16th century, Spaniards brought enslaved Africans to New Spain, including Mission Nombre de Dios in what would become the city of St. Augustine in Spanish Florida. Over time, free Afro-Spaniards took up various trades and occupations and served in the colonial militia. After King Charles II of Spain proclaimed Spanish Florida a safe haven for escaped slaves from British North America, they began escaping to Florida by the hundreds from as far north as New York. The Spanish established Fort Mose for the free Blacks in the St. Augustine area in 1738.

In 1806, enslaved people arrived at the Stone Fort in Nacogdoches, Texas seeking freedom. They arrived with a forged passport from a Kentucky judge. The Spanish refused to return them back to the United States. More freedom seekers traveled through Texas the following year.

Enslaved people were emancipated by crossing the border from the United States into Mexico, which was a Spanish colony into the nineteenth century. In the United States, enslaved people were considered property. That meant that they did not have rights to marry and they could be sold away from their partners. They also did not have rights to fight inhumane and cruel punishment. In New Spain, fugitive slaves were recognized as humans. They were allowed to join the Catholic Church and marry. They also were protected from inhumane and cruel punishment.

During the War of 1812, U.S. Army general Andrew Jackson invaded Spanish Florida in part because enslaved people had run away from plantations in the Carolinas and Georgia to Florida. Some of the runaways joined the Black Seminoles who later moved to Mexico. Mexico sent mixed signals, though, on their position against slavery. Sometimes they allowed enslaved people to returned to slavery and they allowed Americans to move into Spanish territorial property in order to populate the North, where the Americans would then establish cotton plantations, bringing enslaved people to work the land.

In 1829, Mexican president Vicente Guerrero (who was a mixed race black man) formally abolished slavery in Mexico. Freedom seekers from Southern plantations in the Deep South, particularly from Louisiana, Mississippi and Texas, escaped slavery and headed for Mexico. At that time, Texas was part of Mexico. The Texas Revolution, initiated in part to legalize slavery, resulted in the formation of the Republic of Texas in 1836. Following the Battle of San Jacinto, there were some enslaved people who withdrew from the Houston area with the Mexican army, seeing the troops as a means to escape slavery. When Texas joined the Union in 1845, it was a slave state and the Rio Grande became the international border with Mexico.

Pressure between free and slave states deepened as Mexico abolished slavery in 1837 and western states joined the Union as free states. As more free states were added to the Union, the lesser the influence of slave state representatives in Congress.

Slave states and slave hunters 
The Southern Underground Railroad went through slave states, lacking the abolitionist societies and the organized system of the north. People who spoke out against slavery were subject to mobs, physical assault, and being hanged. There were slave catchers who looked for runaway slaves. There were never more than a few hundred free blacks in Texas, which meant that free blacks did not feel safe in the state. The network to freedom was informal, random, and dangerous.

U.S. military forts, established along the Rio Grande border during the Mexican–American War of the 1840s, captured and returned fleeing enslaved people to their slaveholders.

The Fugitive Slave Act of 1850 made it a criminal act to aid fleeing escaping enslaved people in free states. Similarly, the United States government wanted to enact a treaty with Mexico so that they would help capture and return bonds-people. Mexico, however, continued their practice to allow anyone that crossed their borders to be free. Slave catchers continued to cross the southern border into Mexico and illegally capture black people and return them to slavery. A group of slave hunters became the Texas Rangers.

Routes 

Thousands of freedom seekers traveled along a network from the southern United States to Texas and ultimately Mexico. Southern enslaved people generally traveled across "unforgiving country" on foot or horseback while pursued by lawmen and slave hunters. Some stowed away on ferries bound for a Mexican port from New Orleans, Louisiana and Galveston, Texas. There were some who transported cotton to Brownsville, Texas on wagons and then crossed into Mexico at Matamoros.

Many traveled through North Carolina, Arkansas, Alabama, Louisiana, or Mississippi towards Texas and ultimately Mexico. People fled slavery from Indian Territory (now Oklahoma). Black Seminoles traveled on a southwestern route from Florida into Mexico.

Going overland meant that the last 150 miles or so were traversed through the difficult and extremely hot terrain of the Nueces Strip located between the Nueces River and the Rio Grande. There was little shade and a lack of potable water in this brush country. Escapees were more likely to survive the trip if they had a horse and a gun.

The National Park Service identified a route from Natchitoches, Louisiana to Monclova, Mexico in 2010 that is roughly the southern Underground Railroad path. It is also believed that the El Camino Real de los Tejas was a path for freedom. It was made a National Historic Trail by President George W. Bush in 2004.

Assistance 

Some journeyed on their own without assistance, and others were helped by people along the southern Underground Railroad. Assistance included guidance, directions, shelter, and supplies.

Black people, black and white couples, and anti-slavery German immigrants provided support, but most of the help came from Mexican laborers. So much so that enslavers came to distrust any Mexican, and a law was enacted in Texas that forbade Mexicans from talking to enslaved people. Mexican migrant workers developed relationships with enslaved black workers whom they worked with. They offered guidance, such as what it would be like to cross the border, and empathy. Having realized the ways in which Mexicans were helping enslaved people to escape, slaveholders and residents of Texan towns pushed people out of the town, whipped them in public, or lynched them.

Some border officials helped enslaved people crossing into Mexico. In Monclova, Mexico a border official took up a collection in the town for a family in need of food, clothing, and money to continue on their journey south and out of reach of slave hunters. Once they crossed the border, some Mexican authorities helped former enslaved people from being returned to the United States by slave hunters.

Freedom seekers that were taken on ferries to Mexican ports were aided by Mexican ship captains, one of whom was caught in Louisiana and indicted for helping enslaved people escape.

Knowing the repercussions of running away or being caught helping someone runaway, people were careful to "cover their tracks" and public and personal records about freedom seekers are scarce. The are records in greater supply by the people trying to promote slavery or catch enslaved people who have run away. More than 2,500 escapes are documented by the Texas Runaway Slave Project at Stephen F. Austin State University.

Southern freedom seekers 

Advertisements were placed in newspapers offering rewards for the return of their "property". Slave catchers traveled through Mexico. There were Black Seminoles, or Los Mascogos who lived in northern Mexico who provided armed resistance.

Sam Houston, president of the Republic of Texas, was the slaveholder to Tom who ran away. He headed to Texas and once there he enlisted in the Mexican military.

One enslaved man was branded with the letter "R" on each side of his cheek after a failed attempt to escape slavery. He tried again in the winter of 1819, leaving the cotton plantation of his enslaver on horseback. With four others, they traveled south west to Mexico at the risk of being attacked by hostile Native Americans, apprehended by slave catchers, or being attacked by "horse-eating alligators".

Many people did not make it to Mexico. In 1842, a Mexican man and a black woman left Jackson County, Texas on two horses, but they were caught at the Lavaca River. The wife, an enslaved woman, was valuable to her owner so she was returned to slavery. Her husband, possibly a farm laborer or an indentured servant, was immediately lynched.

Freedom seekers changed their names in Mexico. They married into Mexican families and relocated further south of the American-Mexican border. All of these factors makes it hard to trace the whereabouts of the former enslaved people. A database at Stephen F. Austin State University has a database of runaway slave advertisements as part of The Texas Runaway Slave Project. The Works Progress Administration during the Great Depression initiated a Federal Writers' Project to document slave narratives, including those who settled in Mexico. One of them was Felix Haywood who found freedom when he crossed the Rio Grande.

Rio Grande stations 

Two families, the Webbers and the Jacksons, lived along the Rio Grande and helped people escape slavery. The husbands were white and the wives were black women who had been formerly enslaved. It is not known if Nathaniel Jackson purchased the freedom of Matilda Hicks and her family, but in the early 1860s they moved to Hidalgo county, where they settled and lived as a family. He was a white southerner and she was an enslaved woman, who had been childhood sweethearts in Alabama. He was the son of her slaveholder, who helped a group of seven families in 1857 and others cross into Mexico.

Silvia Hector Webber was born enslaved in West Florida and in 1819 was sold to a slaveholder in Clark County, Arkansas. The slaveholders's son, John Cryer, illegally brought Silvia to Mexican Texas in 1828, four years after Mexico had deemed the slave trade into Mexican territory against the law. Silvia, however, with the help of John Webber secured her and her 3 children's freedom papers in 1834. Together Silvia and John lived an antislavery life and often harbored fugitives from slavery in their ranch and house. Silvia was known to transport freedom seekers, on a ferry she licensed at her ranch, onto freedom in Mexico.

John Ferdinand Webber, born in Vermont, lived along the Rio Grande with his wife, Silvia Hector Webber, and together were known to have helped enslaved people cross the Rio Grande. The Jacksons and Webbers, who both owned licensed ferry service, were well known among runaways.

Arrival in Mexico 

Freedom seekers found that when they made it to Mexico, they lived with the knowledge that they could be illegally kidnapped by slave catchers or blackbirders. Slave hunters who tried to kidnap former slaves from Mexico could be taken to court or shot.

There was little support from their new communities and few opportunities for employment. They did not have official paperwork that stated that they were free. They were, though, able to enter into indentured servitude contracts and join military colonies.

Some people, after they settled in Mexico, returned to the United States to help family members escape and to guide them to Mexico.

Colonies 

There were abolitionists from the north who petitioned the Mexican government to establish colonies for free and runaway blacks. Benjamin Lundy, a Quaker, lobbied for a colony to be established in what is now Texas during the early 1830s, but he was unable to do so when Texas legalized slavery when it separated from Mexico and became the Republic of Texas (1836). Black Seminoles successfully petitioned for land and established a colony in 1852. The land is still owned by their descendants.

Scholarship 

The Texas Runaway Slave Project, located in Nacogdoches at the Stephen F. Austin State University, has researched runaway advertisements that appeared in 19,000 editions of newspapers from the mid-19th century.

Alice L. Baumgartner has studied the prevalence of enslaved people who fled slavery from the Southern slave states to Mexico. She published South to Freedom: Runaway Slaves to Mexico and the Road to the Civil War. Thomas Mareite completed a doctoral dissertation at Leiden University on the social and political experiences of enslaved people who escaped from bondage from the US South to Mexico titled Conditional freedom : free soil and fugitive slaves from the US South to Mexico's Northeast, 1803-1861. Roseann Bacha-Garza, of the University of Texas Rio Grande Valley, has managed historical archeology projects and has researched the incidence of enslaved people who fled to Mexico. Maria Esther Hammack completed her doctoral dissertation titled South of Slavery: Freedom Fighters & Black Movement across a Global Frontier, 1790-1868  on the experiences and channels undertaken by freedom seekers, at the University of Texas at Austin.

Mekala Audain recently published a chapter titled "A Scheme to Desert: The Louisiana Purchase and Freedom Seekers in the Louisiana-Texas Borderlands, 1804-1806" in the edited volume In Search of Liberty: African American Internationalism in the Nineteenth-Century Atlantic World. Audain discusses how a large number of freedom seekers had escaped Louisiana in 1804 and "did not associate freedom with the northern US, the Ohio River valley, or Canada; instead they looked to the US western frontier to find freedom."

National Underground Railroad Network

Following upon legislation passed in 1990 for the National Park Service to perform a special resource study of the Underground Railroad, in 1997, the 105th Congress introduced and subsequently passed H.R. 1635 – National Underground Railroad Network to Freedom Act of 1998, which President Bill Clinton signed into law in 1998. This act authorized the United States National Park Service to establish the National Underground Railroad Network to Freedom program to identify associated sites, as well as preserve them and popularize the Underground Railroad and stories of people involved in it. The National Park Service has designated many sites within the network, posted stories about people and places, sponsors an essay contest, and holds a national conference about the Underground Railroad in May or June each year.

The Harriet Tubman Underground Railroad National Historical Park, which includes Underground Railroad routes in three counties of Maryland's Eastern Shore and Harriet Tubman's birthplace, was created by President Barack Obama under the Antiquities Act on March 25, 2013. Its sister park, the Harriet Tubman National Historical Park in Auburn, New York, was established on January 10, 2017, and focuses on the later years of Tubman's life as well as her involvement with the Underground Railroad and the abolition movement.

In popular culture

Inspirations for fiction

 The Underground Railroad is a 2016 novel by Colson Whitehead. It won the 2016 National Book Award and the 2017 Pulitzer Prize for Fiction.
 The Underground Railroad is a 2021 streaming television limited series, based on Whitehead's novel.
 Underground is an American television series that premiered in 2016, on WGN America.

Literature

 David Walker (1829) Appeal to the Coloured Citizens of the World
 Harriet Beecher Stowe (1852) Uncle Tom's Cabin
 Caroline Lee Hentz (1854) The Planter's Northern Bride
 William M. Mitchell (1860) The Under-Ground Railroad
 Sarah Hopkins Bradford (1869) Scenes in the Life of Harriet Tubman; (1896) Harriet Tubman, Moses of Her People

Music

Underground Railroad was a company created by Tupac Shakur, Big D the Impossible, Shock G, Pee Wee, Jeremy, Raw Fusion and Live Squad with the purpose of promote and help young black women and men with records allowing them to initiate and develop their musical careers.

See also

 Angola, Florida
 Ausable Chasm, NY, home of the North Star Underground Railroad Museum
 Bilger's Rocks
 Caroline Quarlls (1824–1892), first known person to escape slavery through Wisconsin's Underground Railroad
 Escape to Sweden, an "underground railroad" during the Holocaust in Norway
 Fort Mose Historic State Park
 List of Underground Railroad sites
 Reverse Underground Railroad
 Slave codes
 Tilly Escape
 Timbuctoo, New York
 Uncle Tom's Cabin Historic Site near Dresden, Ontario

Notes

References

 
 
 
 
 
 Foner, Eric (2015). Gateway To Freedom: The Hidden History of the Underground Railroad. New York, New York: Norton. 
 Forbes, Ella (1998) But We Have No Country: The 1851 Christiana Pennsylvania Resistance. Africana Homestead Legacy Publishers.

Further reading

 Blackett, R.J.M. (2013). Making Freedom: The Underground Railroad and the Politics of Slavery. Chapel Hill, NC: University of North Carolina Press.
  (Stories about Thomas Garrett, a famous agent on the Underground Railroad)
 
Jones, Leesa Bailey (January 7, 2020). "Leesa Jones Interview". State Archives of North Carolina (Oral History). Interviewed by Ellen Brooks. Washington, N.C.
 
  (Classic book documenting the Underground Railroad operations in Philadelphia).
 Public domain ebook at Project Gutenberg
 Book at Internet Archive
 
Strother, Horatio (1962; reissued 2011). The Underground Railroad in Connecticut. Wesleyan University Press. . 
Tilley Turner, Glennette (2001).  The Underground Railroad in Illinois.  Newman Educational Pub. .
 Whitehead, Colson (2016). The Underground Railroad; winner of the Pulitzer Prize in 2017 for this poetical, mythical reflection on the meaning of the Railroad in American history.

Folklore and myth

External links

Underground Railroad Studies
Underground Railroad Timeline
 Friends of the Underground Railroad
National Underground Railroad Freedom Center
Underground Railroad Research Institute at Georgetown College
Underground Railroad in Buffalo and Upstate New York: A bibliography by The Buffalo History Museum
Newspaper articles and clippings about the Underground Railroad at Newspapers.com

 
18th-century establishments in the United States
1865 disestablishments in the United States
Abolitionism in the United States
Secret places in the United States
Events of National Historic Significance (Canada)
Fugitive American slaves